Grapevine Lake is a reservoir located in the North Texas region, about  northwest of Dallas and northeast of Fort Worth. It was impounded in 1952 by the US Army Corps of Engineers when they dammed Denton Creek, a tributary of Trinity River.

The reservoir's primary purposes are flood control and to act as a municipal water reservoir, with a secondary function of providing recreation and open-space areas. The lake's name comes from the city of Grapevine, Texas, to which the lake is adjacent.

History and construction 
On March 2, 1945, the U.S. Congress approved the River and Harbors Act of 1945, which among many projects, provided for the construction of Benbrook Lake, Grapevine Lake, Lavon Lake, and Ray Roberts Lake, as well as modifications to the existing Garza Dam for the construction of Lewisville Lake. All the projects were for the purposes of both flood control and navigation. These lakes became part of an extensive floodway system that is operated in a coordinated manner to minimize flooding along the Trinity River floodplain.

The Grapevine Dam and Reservoir project, as it was originally known, was initiated in January 1948. Located on Denton Creek, a tributary of the Elm Fork of the Trinity River, the project spans parts of both Tarrant and Denton Counties. The project was completed in June 1952, and impounding of water began July 3, 1952.

Statistics 

This gives it a flood capacity of at least , including an allowance for the build-up of sediment in the lake's bottom.

Water rights 
Three municipalities have water rights to the lake: Grapevine, Dallas, and the Dallas County Park Cities, which provides water to various communities in Dallas County.

In February 1981, the city obtained an additional  in the same elevations "until such time as this [water] is needed for navigation purposes."

Recreation

Parks and trails 
Numerous parks surround the lake. Some of the parks are owned, leased, or maintained by the local community. Others remain in the Corps of Engineers' control. The area contains  of natural surface trails, including nature, biking, and equestrian trails.

Trails listed by the Corps of Engineers include the  Northshore trail, the  Rocky Point trail, the  Crosstimbers horse trail, and the  Knob Hill trail.

Camping 
The lake has primitive camping, prepared camping sites, and trailer/RV camping. Murrell Park currently has tent and primitive camping, but is undergoing an expansion to increase camping facilities. Meadowmere Park, managed by the city of Grapevine, offers primitive tent camping. Vineyards campground and cabins, managed by the city of Grapevine, offers RV camping sites, and cabins. Twin Coves Park is managed by the Town of Flower Mound and offers RV sites along with cabins and primitive camping.

Marinas and boating 
Three marinas are located on the lake, all operated by the private company Marinas International. On the south shore, in Grapevine, are Scott's Landing and Silver Lake. On the north shore, in Flower Mound, is Twin Coves. The marinas support an active boating community on the lake; combined, the three marinas have around 1,400 moorings, with land-based storage for an additional 575 vessels.

Both the Grapevine Sailing Club and the United States Coast Guard Auxiliary (Flotilla 5-11 of District 8) are based at Scott's Landing.

Twelve boat ramps provide access to the lake, of which only the two ramps at Murrell Park are controlled by the Corps of Engineers and available for free. Of the remaining ramps:

 The City of Trophy Club operates Trophy Club Park (formerly Marshall Creek Park), which includes a fee-based ramp ($5 for boats on trailers, $1 for kayaks and canoes).
 The City of Grapevine operates public fee-based ramps at Meadowmere, Lakeview, Oak Grove, and Katie's Woods parks.
 The private company Marinas International operates a fee-based ramp at Silver Lake Marina.
 The City of Flower Mound operates a fee-based boat ramp at Twin Coves Park ($10 daily park access fee with annual pass available).

Fishing and hunting 
The lake is home to a number of fish species, including largemouth bass, spotted bass, white bass, white crappie, channel catfish, and alligator gar. Fishing regulations of most species are managed under statewide regulations. The exception is a 14- to 18-inch (36- to 46-cm) slot limit on largemouth bass; (46 cm). Daily bag limit for all species of black bass is five in any combination. Murrell Park, a premier spot for catching sand and black bass on the north shore, was heavily damaged in the summer 2007 flood and was partially closed.

With a hunting license, hunting permit, and in season, public hunting is allowed on the Corps of Engineers land located at the northwest end of the lake. Waterfowl and small game hunting, as well as bow hunting of feral hogs and deer is permitted. Hunting licenses are obtained from the state of Texas and an additional permit from the U.S. Army Corps of Engineers is required.

On March 24, 2010, Kris Howe found four bones of a 96-million-year-old bird. Two Dallas scientists say that the bird is the oldest in America.

Adjacency to Dallas/Fort Worth International Airport 
Grapevine Lake borders Dallas/Fort Worth International Airport to the northwest, making it a major landmark to persons flying into or out of that airport. Many of its features, such as its parks, marinas, and dam, are visible in great detail to the airline passengers upon takeoff or landing.

See also 

 Lewisville Lake
 Lake Ray Roberts
 Trinity River Authority

Notes and references 

 US Corps of Engineers Pertinent Data - Grapevine Lake

External links
Maps
 Corps of Engineers' map of Grapevine lake and parks
 Corps of Engineers' map of Northshore Trail

Information
 Elm Fork Project office of the Corps of Engineer's Grapevine Lake page
 Grapevine lake water level – database of daily lake levels from mid-1970s to current.
 Texas Parks and Wildlife's site about fishing Grapevine Lake
 Guide to Texas Outside's review of Grapevine lake
 Sailing Texas's visit to Grapevine lake
 US Coast Guard Auxiliary Flotilla 5-11 District 8, based at Scott's Landing
 Grapevine sailing club, based at Scott's Landing
 Buoys on the Lake at Twin Coves Marina
 Twin Coves Park

Reservoirs in Texas
Trinity River (Texas)
Bodies of water of Denton County, Texas
Bodies of water of Tarrant County, Texas
Protected areas of Denton County, Texas
Protected areas of Tarrant County, Texas
1952 establishments in Texas